The Luhansk People's Republic football team (or Lugansk) is a team representing the Luhansk People's Republic (LPR), a disputed Russian republic in eastern Ukraine. The team is not affiliated with FIFA or UEFA and therefore cannot compete for the FIFA World Cup or the UEFA European Championship. Occasionally, the LPR team has been a member of CONIFA, although it currently is not as of November 2022.

History
The Luhansk Football Union was founded on October 4, 2014. FC Zorya Luhansk alumnus Anatoliy Kuksov coached the team prior to his death in January 2022. The LPR team took part in the 2018 CONIFA World Football Cup qualification but failed to make it through to the finals. Sascha Düerkop, general secretary of CONIFA, stated that he did not agree with the LPR team politically — comparing them negatively with the Chagossians — but that "that was not the point" and they were allowed to compete. CONIFA were criticised for supporting "Russia-backed separatism." The LPR team was scheduled to take part in the 2019 CONIFA European Football Cup but later withdrew.

International results

See also 

 Donetsk People's Republic national football team

Notes

References 

European national and official selection-teams not affiliated to FIFA
football
Sport in Luhansk Oblast
CONIFA member associations
2015 establishments in Ukraine